Jenny Rom is an Italian dance singer known for her high-pitched, fast-paced dance music. She is produced under SAIFAM Publishing Group Italy. Her songs have been featured in Japan's Dancemania music compilation series, especially its Speed sub-series. Rom was first started by one of SAIFAM's DJ groups, DJ JAXX, starting with the song "Do You Want A Flirt?". The second song she was "WWW.BLONDE GIRL". Rom and The Zippers are extremely close alias groups with the same sound used by SAIFAM. Recently, The Zippers have turned to doing covers instead of the Jenny Rom style.

Video games
Jenny Rom has four songs which appear in dance video games, including Dance Dance Revolution and StepManiaX.

References

External links
Jenny Rom biography, news, discography at Bubblegum Dancer

Living people
Italian pop singers
Italian dance musicians
Italian women singer-songwriters
Italian singer-songwriters
Year of birth missing (living people)